Marie Sizun (born 1940) is a French writer. She taught in Germany and Belgium for many years before returning to Paris in 2001. Sizun started her career as a full-time writer after retirement, publishing her first novel Le Père de la petite (2005) at the age of 65. The book has been translated in English by Peirene Press under the title Her Father's Daughter. Sizun has won several awards for her work.

Bibliography 
2005: Le Père de la petite, Arléa
2007: La femme de l’Allemand, Arléa, Grand prix des lectrices de Elle
2008: Jeux croisés, Arléa
2008: Le Père de la petite, Arléa-Poche
2009: Éclats d'enfance, Arléa
2011: Plage, Arléa
2012: Un léger déplacement, Arléa
2013: Un jour par la forêt, Arléa
2015: La Maison-Guerre, Arlea

References

French women writers
1940 births
Living people